Bastam District is a district (bakhsh) in Shahrud County, Semnan Province, Iran. At the 2006 census, its population was 37,635, in 10,380 families.  The District has three cities: Bastam, Mojen, and Kalateh Khij. The District has two rural districts (dehestan): Kalat-e Hay-ye Gharbi Rural District and Kharqan Rural District.

References 

Districts of Semnan Province
Shahrud County